Below are the rosters for teams competing in the 2017 World Junior Ice Hockey Championships.

Group A

Head coach:  Jakub Petr

Head coach:  Olaf Eller

Head coach:  Jukka Rautakorpi /  Jussi Ahokas

Head coach:  Tomas Montén

Head coach:  Christian Wohlwend

Group B

Head coach:  Dominique Ducharme

Head coach:  Ēriks Miļuns

Head coach:  Valeri Bragin

Head coach:  Ernest Bokroš

Head coach:  Bob Motzko

External links
worldjunior2017.com

Rosters
World Junior Ice Hockey Championships rosters